Cryptogemma chilensis is a species of sea snail, a marine gastropod mollusk in the family Turridae, the turrids.

Description

Distribution
This marine species occurs off Chile.

References

 Berry, S. S. 1968. Notices of new eastern Pacific Mollusca.-VII. Leaflets in Malacology 1(25):155-158.

chilensis
Gastropods described in 1968